Lachenalia bulbifera, syn. L. pendula, is a species of flowering plant in the family Asparagaceae, native to the Western Cape of South Africa. The Latin bulbifera literally means "bulb-bearing", and refers to the plant's habit of producing bulblets, which can be separated from the parent plant and grown on.

This plant requires a sheltered, frost-free position, or it can be grown under glass. The species and its pink-flowered cultivar 'George' have gained the Royal Horticultural Society's Award of Garden Merit.

References

External links
 

bulbifera
Flora of the Cape Provinces